Martin Streit (born February 2, 1977) is a Czech former professional ice hockey winger who played in the Czech Extraliga. Streit was drafted in the seventh round, 178th overall, of the 1995 NHL Entry Draft by the Philadelphia Flyers. He was also selected in the 2000 NHL Expansion Draft by the Columbus Blue Jackets.

Career statistics

Regular season and playoffs

International

External links 

 

1977 births
Czech ice hockey left wingers
HC Havířov players
HC Karlovy Vary players
HC Olomouc players
HC Vítkovice players
VHK Vsetín players
Living people
People from Vyškov
Philadelphia Flyers draft picks
Sportspeople from the South Moravian Region